Microlophus barringtonensis or the Santa Fe lava lizard is a species of lava lizard or a population of Microlophus albemarlensis. It inhabits Santa Fe island in the Galápogos. It is the only lava lizard on Santa Fe. It is extremely common.

Etymology 
barringtonensis refers to its range in Santa Fe island, formerly named Barrington Island.

Classification 
It is debated whether the species is a population or not. Authors have claimed that the population is an entire other species along with M. jacobi and M. indefatigabilis. This view is not widely accepted.

References 
 

  
barringtonensis
Endemic fauna of the Galápagos Islands
Reptiles described in 1892
Taxa named by Georg Baur